Biswa Kalyan Rath is an Indian stand-up comedian, writer and YouTuber. He came into prominence through the YouTube comedy series, Pretentious Movie Reviews with fellow comedian Kanan Gill. He played a supporting role in the 2016 Netflix sex comedy film Brahman Naman. He created the 2017 Amazon Prime Video's series Laakhon Mein Ek. On 9 December 2020, Rath married actress Sulagna Panigrahi.

Career
After graduation in Biotechnology from IIT Kharagpur in 2012, he worked in graphic design, advertising, and software. It was during this time that he met Kanan Gill at an open mic event in Bangalore in 2013. He quit his job at Oracle in 2014 to become a full-time comedian.

Biswa and Kanan came up with the idea of the Pretentious Movie Reviews, a series of videos which soon went viral on YouTube. In this series, they review critically panned Bollywood films. They chose Bollywood movies because they are so embedded in the Indian pop culture. In 2014, he performed his first live show along with Kanan Gill in Gurgaon.

He started doing stand-up comedy in 2015 and went on his first solo national tour, Biswa In your face in September 2015, doing shows in Bangalore, Pune, Mumbai, Hyderabad and Kolkata. In 2015, he hosted the Comedy Hunt along AIB and other comedians and also did a tour named Biswa Mast Aadmi. He has also created a web series called "Laakhon Mein Ek" which released on Amazon Prime Video in October 2017. and appeared on HDFC Life's Behind the Journey video series

In December 2020, Biswa launched an exclusive Masterclass for the aspiring stand up comedians with FrontRow.

Filmography

Film

Web

References

External links

Indian stand-up comedians
Living people
Indian male comedians
1989 births